Harmon Face Values (also known as Harmon Discount, Harmon Discount Health & Beauty, or simply Harmon) was an American Northeastern chain of stores that mainly sold healthcare and beauty supplies at a discounted price. It was owned by Bed Bath & Beyond from March 2002 up until its liquidation in January 2023.

On March 4, 2002, Bed Bath & Beyond acquired the Harmon brand, and became a full-on subsidiary of the chain.

On April 16, 2007, Harmon Discount Health & Beauty was renamed to its current name, Harmon Face Values.

On September 29, 2017, Bed Bath & Beyond experienced a new store format called "Face Values & Beyond", a mix of a Bed Bath & Beyond store and a Harmon Face Values store. However, it closed in 2022.

On January 5, 2023, it was announced that Harmon's parent company, Bed Bath & Beyond, was in financial distress and considering the possibility of filing for bankruptcy within the coming months.

On January 27, 2023, Bed Bath & Beyond announced that it would be closing all Harmon stores.

References

Retail companies of the United States
American companies established in 1971
Retail companies established in 1971
Beauty stores
Union Township, Union County, New Jersey
Companies based in Union County, New Jersey
Retail companies disestablished in 2023
2023 disestablishments in New Jersey